Anusin  is a village in the administrative district of Gmina Ciepielów, within Lipsko County, Masovian Voivodeship, in east-central Poland. The 2016 Polish census reported the population of the village as 420 people.

References

Anusin